The following is the official canvassing of votes by the Congress of the Philippines for the 2016 Philippine presidential and vice presidential election. The canvassing started on May 25, 2016 and ended 2 days later. This was the fastest congressional canvassing process in Philippine electoral history until 2022.

The Congress is mandated to declare a winner 30 days after the elections (June 8).

Process
After voters had finished voting, the counting machines will then count the votes received by each candidate in each position. For positions elected on a national basis (president, vice president, senators and party-list representatives), the counting machine will then print an election return for that precinct, and will transmit the results to the municipal/city board of canvassers, Congress, Commission on Elections, the citizen's arm authorized by the commission, political parties, and others.

The city or municipality will then tally the votes for all positions and will issue two documents at its conclusion: a statement of votes where the votes obtained by candidates in each precinct in a city/municipality is stated; and a certificate of canvass (COC), a document in electronic and printed form containing the total votes in figures obtained by each candidate in the city or municipality. The city or municipal COC will either be sent electronically to Congress (if the city is an Independent city with its own legislative district) or to the provincial board of canvassers in which the process is repeated; this time the provincial COC will be sent to Congress.

Congress, sitting as the National Board of Canvassers, will canvass the votes to determine who among the candidates are elected president and vice president.

In theory, all of the votes from the election returns when added must be equal to the votes canvassed by Congress coming from the city/provincial COCs.

The provincial/city board of canvassers will send an electronically transmitted COC to the Congress' Consolidation and Canvassing System (CCS) server, which was activated minutes after voting closed on May 9. Meanwhile, the manually counted and physically delivered COCs from the provincial and/or city board of canvassers will be sent first to the Senate then it will be brought to the Batasang Pambansa Complex, the home of the House of Representatives upon the convening of both the Senate and the House of Representatives in a joint session.

The canvassing committee will tabulate the results of each COC in the order they were received electronically in the Consolidation and Canvassing System (CCS) and physically delivered to Congress for manually prepared COCs with no electronic transmission.

The committee will then compare the electronically received COC from the physically delivered COC for any discrepancy. In cases of discrepancies, Congress may summon the chairperson of the provincial/city board of canvassers from where city/province the COC came from. For overseas absentee voting COCs, the board of canvassers may be contacted through any forms of communication deemed safe and reliable by the committee.

After all of the COCs were canvassed, the joint committee will furnish a report to be approved by majority vote by both House and Senate voting separately.

Members of the canvassing committee
Instead of the whole Congress canvassing the votes, a committee comprised evenly between the Senate and the House of Representatives will canvass the votes at the Batasang Pambansa Complex in Quezon City, the home of the House of Representatives. Senator Aquilino Pimentel III and House Majority Leader Neptali Gonzales II will co-chair the proceedings instead of Senate President Franklin Drilon and the House Speaker Feliciano Belmonte, Jr.  Previously, the Senate President and the House Speaker played this role. The composition of the joint congressional canvassing committee was announced on May 24, 2016.

Members of Congress who ran for president (Grace Poe and Miriam Defensor Santiago) and vice president (Alan Peter Cayetano, Francis Escudero, Gregorio Honasan, Bongbong Marcos, Leni Robredo and Antonio Trillanes) are banned from attending the proceedings.

Each political party is entitled to two lawyers who may file motions before Congress. All presidential candidates and 4 vice presidential candidates (except Honasan and Trillanes) have lawyers for the canvassing period.

Proceedings

May 25
On May 25, before the start of canvassing, Didagen Dilangalen, lawyer of Bongbong Marcos, requested for separate canvassing of presidential and vice presidential results. This motion was made for an early proclamation of presumptive president Rodrigo Duterte and for more thorough examination of the tight vice presidential race. The joint committee rejected his motion and proceeded on canvassing on a per certificate of canvass (COC) basis. Davao del Sur's COC was first canvassed. Discrepancies of COCs of Davao del Norte, Ilocos Sur and Laguna were found and their results were deferred. The Provincial Board of Canvassers of these provinces were summoned to address these issues. The committee have admitted for canvassing a total of 45 COCs from 20 provinces, 15 cities, 1 district and 9 countries.

May 26
On May 26, the camp of Davao City mayor Rodrigo Duterte urged Bongbong Marcos to convince his running mate, Miriam Defensor Santiago to concede in the presidential race so that it would hasten the canvassing and the proclamation of Duterte as the President. Discrepancies of COCs of Antique were found and their results were deferred, while the canvassing of COCs from Kuwait and Canada were suspended since the physically delivered COCs were not yet delivered to Congress and their respective electronically transmitted COCs are only available. The Certificate of Canvass for Iloilo City was not found inside the ballot boxes sent to Congress and ordered the chairperson of the Iloilo City Board of Canvassers to appear on May 27. The COCs for Davao del Norte, Ilocos Sur and Laguna were admitted to the canvass after their respective PBOC chairpersons appeared to the committee and explained the discrepancies. In total, the joint committee admitted to canvass 69 CoCs from 54 provinces, 8 cities, and 6 countries.

May 27
The committee first resumed consideration for the canvassing the COCs for Antique, Kuwait, and Iloilo City. The Antique COC was admitted for canvassing after the chairman of the provincial board of canvassers appeared before the joint committee to explain the discrepancies. The COC from Kuwait has been delivered by Comelec representatives before the joint committee convened. The COC for Iloilo City were canvassed after the chairperson of its city board of canvassers located the COC inside the ballot box that were sent to Congress. For the COC from Canada, the Comelec representative explained that the physical COC was only shipped on May 26 and it will take about three to five days before it will be delivered to Congress. However, they have a certified true copy of the COC, which Comelec received via e-mail. This was also the case for the COC from Austria. The committee finished the canvassing of all electronically transmitted and manually prepared COCs (including the local absentee and detainee voting COCs) in three days, the fastest canvassing of results for President and Vice President in Philippine election history.

Presidential election
Based on the official canvass of the Congress of the Philippines.

*withdrew from the race but is included in the ballot; all votes cast for him are spoiled.

Absentee voters
*withdrew from the race but is included in the ballot; all votes cast for him are spoiled.

Vice presidential election

Based on the official canvass of the Congress of the Philippines.

Absentee voters

References

2016 Philippine presidential election